This is a list of the gymnasts who represented their country at the 1984 Summer Olympics in Los Angeles from 28 July to 12 August 1984. Gymnasts across two disciplines (artistic gymnastics and rhythmic gymnastics) participated in the Games.

Female artistic gymnasts

Male artistic gymnasts

Rhythmic gymnasts

References 

Lists of gymnasts
Gymnastics at the 1984 Summer Olympics